A Ywal Thone Parr Chit Tat Thee is a 2017 Burmese drama film, directed Maung Myo Min starring Yan Aung, Kyaw Ye Aung, Pyay Ti Oo, Moht Moht Myint Aung, Khine Thin Kyi, Wutt Hmone Shwe Yi, May Thinzar Oo and Kyaw Kyaw. The film, produced by Lucky Seven Film Production premiered Myanmar on May 5, 2017.

Cast
Pyay Ti Oo
Wutt Hmone Shwe Yi
Yan Aung
Moht Moht Myint Aung
Kyaw Ye Aung
Khine Thin Kyi
May Thinzar Oo
Kyaw Kyaw

References

2017 films
2010s Burmese-language films
Burmese drama films
Films shot in Myanmar